Granadero Baigorria is a city in the south of the province of Santa Fe, Argentina, located directly north of Rosario, on the western shore of the Paraná River, and forming part of the Greater Rosario metropolitan area. Its population is about 43,000 inhabitants (2015).

Granadero Baigorria is named after Juan Bautista Baigorria, a cavalry soldier of the Mounted Grenadiers (Granaderos a Caballo) who fought for General José de San Martín in the battle of San Lorenzo on 3 February 1813, the first of the Argentine War of Independence.

Features
The city features a camping site, beaches, and several islands on the Paraná. Cultural spotlights include an Artisans' Square, a museum, and several churches and shrines. Granadero Baigorria is also home to the first Portland cement factory in Argentina.

The city has a 137-bed public (provincial) hospital, Hospital Escuela Eva Perón, which together with two other hospitals and nine primary care healthcare centers, in the Rosario metropolitan area supply medical services. It is located on 1645 San Martín Avenue. The name of the hospital is an homage to Eva Perón, the renowned First Lady of Argentina in the mid-20th century and an icon of Peronism.

The city has many important producers of tractors and combine harvesters like John Deere  and Marani-Agrinar (formerly known as Massey Ferguson since 1969 to 2002 and previously the Hanomag-Cura).

External links
In Spanish unless otherwise noted.
 Datos útiles - Useful data for the visitor, on the website of La Capital newspaper.
 Desarrollo Sostenible - Sustainable Development in Santa Fe.

References

Cities in Argentina
Populated places in Santa Fe Province
Paraná River